Puerto Rico competed at the 2019 Parapan American Games held from August 23 to September 1, 2019 in Lima, Peru. In total, athletes representing Puerto Rico won three silver medals and the country finished in 19th place in the medal table.

Medalists

Athletics 

Carmelo Rivera Fuentes won the silver medal in the men's 1500 metres T20 event.

Judo 

Luiz Perez Diaz won the silver medal in the men's 66 kg event.

Swimming 

Darvin Baez Eliza won the silver medal in the men's 100m breaststroke SB12 event.

References 

2019 in Puerto Rican sports
Nations at the 2019 Parapan American Games